The Ao language is a Naga language spoken by the Ao Naga in Nagaland of northeast India. It is written from Latin Script

Ao language cluster
Ethnologue lists the following varieties of Ao.
Mongsen Khari
Changki
Chongli (Chungli)
Dordar (Yacham)
Longla

Chongli and Mongsen are nearly mutually unintelligible.

Mills (1926) lists the Ao Naga tribes of Nagaland as speaking three languages: Chungli, Mongsen, and Changki. Chungli Ao and Mongsen Ao are spoken in majority of the Ao villages, whereas Changki speakers form the minor speakers.

Mongsen Ao is spoken primarily in the western part of Ao territory.

Changki Ao is spoken only in 3 villages - Changki, Japu and Longjemdang - which is poorly documented though reportedly related to Mongsen Ao. Some Changki speakers can fluently converse in both Mongsen and Chungli, but a Mongsen Ao cannot speak Changki or understand it, whereas a Chungli can hardly understand or speak Changki. Chungli Ao and Mongsen Ao are not mutually intelligible.

The speech of each Ao village has its own distinctive characteristics. Many villages contain both Chungli and Mongsen speakers.

Phonology

Vowels

Consonants

Tones
This language has 3 tones, mid tone ˧ rising tone ˩˥ and falling tone ˥˩.

References

van Driem, George (2001). Languages of the Himalayas: An Ethnolinguistic Handbook of the Greater Himalayan Region. Leiden: Brill.
Bruhn, Daniel Wayne. 2014. A Phonological Reconstruction of Proto-Central Naga. Ph.D. dissertation. University of California, Berkeley.
Saul, J. D. 2005. The Naga of Burma: Their festivals, customs and way of life. Bangkok, Thailand: Orchid Press.
Barkman, Tiffany. 2014. A descriptive grammar of Jejara (Para Naga). MA thesis, Chiang Mai: Payap University.
Shi, Vong Tsuh. 2009. Discourse studies of Makuri Naga narratives . MA thesis, Chiang Mai: Payap University.
Language and Social Development Organization (LSDO). 2006. A sociolinguistic survey of Makuri, Para, and Long Phuri Naga in Layshi Township, Myanmar. Unpublished manuscript.
Mills, J. P (1926). The Ao Nagas. London: MacMillan & Co.

See also
 Ao people
 T Senka Ao

Languages of Nagaland